"Livin' on the Edge" is a song by American hard rock band Aerosmith. The song was written by Steven Tyler, Joe Perry, and Mark Hudson. It was released in February 1993 as the first single from the band's commercially successful album Get a Grip. The single reached number 18 on the US Billboard Hot 100 chart, number three on the Cash Box Top 100, and number one on the Billboard Album Rock Tracks chart, where it remained for nine weeks. In the UK, the song peaked at number 19 on the UK Singles Chart in April 1993.

Background
According to the band's autobiography Walk This Way, the song was inspired by the 1992 Los Angeles riots. Tyler also mentions in the book that the song features the sound of a bass drum he stole from his high school; four loud beats are heard from that drum in a pause between the final verse and chorus.

Music video
The music video depicts vandalism, grand theft auto, joyriding, airbag crashing, unprotected sex, violence among school-aged youth, cross-dressing teachers, a naked Steven Tyler holding a zipper by his crotch with half his body painted black (to give the effect he pulled down a zipper, unzipping his body) and lead guitarist Joe Perry playing a lead guitar solo in front of an oncoming McCloud River Railroad freight train. The train scene was filmed on Lake Britton Bridge in Shasta County, California, the same bridge where Stand by Me filmed their famous train scene and employs the same Introvision technology. Directed by Marty Callner, the video features actor Edward Furlong.

Reception
"Livin' on the Edge" met with dismissive reactions from music critics. Reviewing Get a Grip for Rolling Stone, Mark Coleman cited "Livin' on the Edge" as an example of the album "playing it safe according to strict late-Eighties directives", and added that it "ascends into a soaring, Bon Jovi-esque power chorale; only the gritty guitars on the bridge keep the damn thing grounded." David Browne of Entertainment Weekly also found the song was uncomfortably derivative of Bon Jovi, remarking that it "might have worked better if it didn’t sound like Bon Jovi trying hard to sound like Aerosmith." Both Browne and Allmusic's Stephen Thomas Erlewine described the song's lyrics as a halfhearted, ineffectual attempt at social commentary.

The song won a Grammy Award for Best Rock Performance By A Duo Or Group With Vocal for the year 1993. The video for the song earned the band a Viewer's Choice award at the 1993 MTV Video Music Awards. The video was also voted "Best Video" by Metal Edge readers in the magazine's 1993 Readers' Choice Awards.

Live performances
"Livin' on the Edge" has been a staple at Aerosmith concerts ever since its release. During the Get a Grip Tour, the band performed a portion of "She Cried" (a song recorded by Jay and the Americans, among other artists) as the intro to "Livin' on the Edge". Performances often involved Tyler screaming "There ain't no life nowhere" (from the song "I Don't Live Today" by The Jimi Hendrix Experience) and then breathing heavily over a bright light during the brief interlude. "Livin' on the Edge" was performed at the 1993 MTV Video Music Awards, the 36th Grammy Awards, and at Woodstock '94. Additionally, the band performed the song as part of its set at the United We Stand benefit concert, held in Washington, D.C. shortly after the September 11 terrorist attacks.

Track listings
CD single

US maxi-CD single

Strictly limited-edition CD single

German CD single

Charts

Weekly charts

Year-end charts

Release history

References

External links
 

Aerosmith songs
1992 songs
1993 singles
1990s ballads
Music videos directed by Marty Callner
Geffen Records singles
Song recordings produced by Bruce Fairbairn
Songs based on actual events
Songs written by Joe Perry (musician)
Songs written by Mark Hudson (musician)
Songs written by Steven Tyler